Ivan Yanakov (born 7 July 1994), is a professional Ukrainian football midfielder who plays for Dnipro Cherkasy.

Career
He is product of the Yenakiyeve sportive academy and FC Illichivets Mariupol sportive school.

He made his début for FC Illichivets Mariupol in the Ukrainian Premier League on 20 September 2014.

References

External links

1994 births
Living people
People from Yenakiieve
Ukrainian footballers
FC Mariupol players
FC Illichivets-2 Mariupol players
FC Poltava players
FC Kremin Kremenchuk players
FC Dnipro Cherkasy players
Ukrainian Premier League players
Association football midfielders
Ukrainian Second League players
Sportspeople from Donetsk Oblast